Below are the results for season 13 (XIII) of the World Poker Tour (2014–15).

Results

WPT500 at ARIA Resort & Casino

 Casino: ARIA Resort & Casino, Las Vegas, Nevada
 Buy-in: $500 + $65
 6-Day Event: July 4–9, 2014
 Number of Entries: 3,599
 Total Prize Pool: $1,799,500
 Number of Payouts: 432

Legends of Poker

 Casino: The Bicycle Casino, Bell Gardens, California
 Buy-in: $3,500 + $200 ($10,000 on Day 2)
 7-Day Event: August 23–29, 2014
 Number of Entries: 593
 Total Prize Pool: $2,172,994
 Number of Payouts: 54

Merit Classic North Cyprus

 Casino: Merit Crystal Cove Hotel and Casino, Alsancak Mevkii Kyrenia, Cyprus
 Buy-in: $4,000 + 400
 6-Day Event: September 5–10, 2014
 Number of Entries: 404
 Total Prize Pool: $1,486,720
 Number of Payouts: 45

Borgata Poker Open

 Casino: Borgata, Atlantic City, New Jersey
 Buy-in: $3,300 + $200
 6-Day Event: September 14–19, 2014
 Number of Entries: 1,226
 Total Prize Pool: $3,924,426
 Number of Payouts: 120

WPT Caribbean

 Casino: Casino Royale, Maho Bay, St. Maarten
 Buy-in: $3,200 + $300
 5-Day Event: November 3–7, 2014
 Number of Entries: 118
 Total Prize Pool: $366,272
 Number of Payouts: 15
 Note: Elias became the first player to win back-to-back WPT titles in the same season.

bestbet Bounty Scramble

 Casino: bestbet Jacksonville, Jacksonville, Florida
 Buy-in: $4,650 + $350
 5-Day Event: November 7–11, 2014
 Number of Entries: 461
 Total Prize Pool: $2,143,652
 Number of Payouts: 54

WPT500 at Dusk Till Dawn

 Casino: Dusk Till Dawn Casino & Poker, Lenton, Nottingham, England
 Buy-in: £500
 8-Day Event: November 9–16, 2014
 Number of Entries: 2,133
 Total Prize Pool: £959,850
 Number of Payouts: 200

Emperors Palace Poker Classic

 Casino: Emperors Palace Hotel Casino, Johannesburg, South Africa
 Buy-in: $3,300 + $200
 3-Day Event: November 14–16, 2014
 Number of Entries: 166
 Total Prize Pool: $547,800
 Number of Payouts: 18

WPT UK

 Casino: Dusk Till Dawn Casino & Poker, Lenton, Nottingham, England
 Buy-in: £3,000
 6-Day Event: November 18–23, 2014
 Number of Entries: 354
 Total Prize Pool: £955,800
 Number of Payouts: 45

WPT Montreal

 Casino: Playground Poker Club, Kahnawake, Quebec
 Buy-in: $3,500 + $350
 7-Day Event: November 20–26, 2014
 Number of Entries: 732
 Total Prize Pool: $2,301,066
 Number of Payouts: 90

Five Diamond World Poker Classic

 Casino: Bellagio, Las Vegas, Nevada
 Buy-in: $10,000 + $300
 6-Day Event: December 15–20, 2014
 Number of Entries: 586
 Total Prize Pool: $5,684,200
 Number of Payouts: 54

Borgata Winter Poker Open

 Casino: Borgata, Atlantic City, New Jersey
 Buy-in: $3,300 + $200
 6-Day Event: January 25–30
 Number of Entries: 989
 Total Prize Pool: $3,165,789
 Number of Payouts: 90

Lucky Hearts Poker Open

 Casino: Seminole Hard Rock Hotel and Casino, Hollywood, Florida
 Buy-in: $3,200 + $200 + $100
 7-Day Event: February 5–11
 Number of Entries: 1,027
 Total Prize Pool: $3,286,400
 Number of Payouts: 100

Fallsview Poker Classic

 Casino: Fallsview Casino, Niagara Falls, Ontario
 Buy-in: $4,700 + $300
 4-Day Event: February 13–16
 Number of Entries: 419
 Total Prize Pool: $1,910,221
 Number of Payouts: 54

L.A. Poker Classic

 Casino: Commerce Casino, Commerce, California
 Buy-in: $9,600 + $400
 6-Day Event: February 28-March 5
 Number of Entries: 538
 Total Prize Pool: $5,164,800
 Number of Payouts: 63

Bay 101 Shooting Star

 Casino: Bay 101, San Jose, California
 Buy-in: $7,150 + $350
 5-Day Event: March 9–13
 Number of Entries: 708
 Total Prize Pool: $5,062,200
 Number of Payouts: 72

WPT Vienna

 Casino: Montesino, Vienna, Austria
 Buy-in: €3,000 + €300
 6-Day Event: March 12–17
 Number of Entries: 220
 Total Prize Pool: €660,000
 Number of Payouts: 27

WPT Rolling Thunder

 Casino: Thunder Valley Casino Resort, Lincoln, California
 Buy-in: $3,200 + $300
 5-Day Event: March 14–18
 Number of Entries: 379
 Total Prize Pool: $1,212,800
 Number of Payouts: 45

Seminole Hard Rock Poker Showdown

 Casino: Seminole Hard Rock Hotel and Casino, Hollywood, Florida
 Buy-in: $3,200 + $200 + $100
 7-Day Event: April 16–22
 Number of Entries: 1,476
 Total Prize Pool: $5,000,000
 Number of Payouts: 150

WPT World Championship

 Casino: Borgata, Atlantic City, New Jersey
 Buy-in: $15,000 + $400
 6-Day Event: April 24–29
 Number of Entries: 239
 Total Prize Pool: $3,462,050
 Number of Payouts: 27

Other events
During season 13 of the WPT there was one special event that did not apply to the Player of the Year standings:
 The WPT Monster Invitational - September 21, 2009 - Borgata Casino - postscript to Event #4: Borgata Poker Open. Won by David Williams.

References

World Poker Tour
2014 in poker
2015 in poker